Angustia is a genus of flies in the family Tachinidae.

Species
A. angustivitta (Aldrich & Webber, 1924)
A. pallens (Reinhard, 1945)
A. pallidipalpis (Wulp, 1890)

References

Diptera of North America
Exoristinae
Tachinidae genera